Mostafa Mehmud (16 January 1936 – 9 April 2017) was a Bangladeshi film director who made his film debut with Songsar (1968). In 1972, he directed the first film released in independent Bangladesh, Manusher Mon starring Razzak and Bobita.

Filmography
 Dui Bhai (1968)
 Momer Alo (1968)
 Songsar (1968)
 Mayar Songsar (1969)
 Manusher Mon (1972)

References

1936 births
2017 deaths
Bangladeshi film directors
Bangladeshi directors